Charlie McCarthy (born in Gneeveguilla, County Kerry, Ireland) played Gaelic football with his local club Gneeveguilla. At the age of 19 he was a member of the Kerry senior inter-county team during the 1996 Championship campaign. That year Kerry won their first Munster Championship since 1991. McCarthy was part of the Kerry team that won the 1995 and 1996 All Ireland Under 21 titles. He also won an All Ireland Minor Medal with Kerry in 1994, the last time Kerry won the All Ireland minor competition. McCarthy  played centre back  and won the "man of the match award" in that game. He won three consecutive Kerry Senior County Championship medals with East Kerry in 1997, 1998 and 1999.

References

Year of birth missing (living people)
Living people
Gneeveguilla Gaelic footballers
Kerry inter-county Gaelic footballers
People from Gneeveguilla